Novelty Forever is the fourth album by Californian punk rock band Bracket, released by Fat Wreck Chords on September 23, 1997.  The album would be the last to feature founding guitarist Larry Tinney and the first to be produced by Ryan Greene, along with Fat Mike.

Although Bracket had been issuing vinyl releases on Fat Wreck Chords since 1994, Novelty Forever marked the band's first full-length for the label.  Prior to the album's release, "The Evil Bean" was included on the Appetite for Food EP.  "Sour" was later featured on the compilation Physical Fatness.

Track listing
All songs written and composed by Bracket.
"Last Day Sunday" – 3:03
"Three Gardens" – 2:40
"The Evil Bean" – 2:44
"Don't Tell Miss Fenley" – 2:28
"Sour" – 2:22
"Back to Allentown" – 2:56
"Little Q & A" – 2:50
"One More Hangover Day (Warren's Song, Pt. 7)" – 3:34
"I Won't Mind" – 2:29
"Optimist" – 2:10
"Drama Queen" – 3:31
"Little Q & A (Reprise)" – 1:13

Personnel
 Marty Gregori – vocals, guitar
 Larry Tinney – guitar
 Zack Charlos – bass, vocals
 Ray Castro – drums
 Ryan Greene – producer
 Bracket – producer
 Fat Mike – producer
 Joe Marquez – engineer
 Peter Ellenby – photography
 Vinny Wintermeyer – photography

References

External links
 Fat Wreck Chords album page

1997 albums
Bracket (band) albums
Fat Wreck Chords albums
Albums produced by Ryan Greene